Same-sex marriage is legal in the following countries: Argentina, Australia, Austria, Belgium, Brazil, Canada, Chile, Colombia, Costa Rica, Cuba, Denmark, Ecuador, Finland, France, Germany, Iceland, Ireland, Luxembourg, Malta, Mexico, the Netherlands, New Zealand, Norway, Portugal, Slovenia, South Africa, Spain, Sweden, Switzerland, Taiwan, the United Kingdom, the United States, and Uruguay. Same-sex marriage is recognized, but not performed in Israel. Same-sex marriage will come into force on 17 February 2023 in Andorra. Furthermore, same-sex marriages performed in the Netherlands are recognized in Aruba, Curaçao and Sint Maarten.

An alternative form of legal recognition other than marriage is recognized in Andorra, Croatia, Cyprus, the Czech Republic, Estonia, Greece, Hungary, Italy, Liechtenstein, Monaco, Montenegro, San Marino, and on a subnational level in Aruba, a constituent country of the Kingdom of the Netherlands and the Cayman Islands and Bermuda, territories of the United Kingdom.

International level 

Several attempts have been made to establish a right to same-sex marriage at the international level through strategic litigation, at the Human Rights Committee of the United Nations and at the European Court of Human Rights, both of which currently have not yet recognized an equal right to marry for same-sex couples. The Human Rights Committee case was in 1999, with two same-sex couples as the plaintiffs/petitioners and the government of New Zealand as the defender/respondent. The ECHR case, Schalk and Kopf v Austria, was in 2010, with a same-sex couple as the plaintiffs/petitioners and the government of Austria as the respondents. Although both New Zealand and Austria then responded against the petitions then in each case, both countries now legally recognize same-sex marriage.  However, new cases were raised regarding same-sex marriage recognition, e.g. Andersen v. Poland.

Inter-American Court of Human Rights ruling 
On 8 January 2018, the Inter-American Court of Human Rights (IACHR) ruled that the American Convention on Human Rights mandates and requires the legalisation of same-sex marriage. The landmark ruling was fully binding on Costa Rica and set binding precedent in the other signatory countries. The Court recommended that governments issue temporary decrees legalising same-sex marriage until new legislation is brought in. The ruling applies to the countries of Barbados, Bolivia, Chile, Costa Rica, the Dominican Republic, Ecuador, El Salvador, Guatemala, Haiti, Honduras, Mexico, Nicaragua, Panama, Paraguay, Peru and Suriname. The Costa Rican Government subsequently announced that it would implement the ruling "in its totality", and the Government of Panama has also signalled that it would accept the ruling.

Coman and Others v Inspectoratul General pentru Imigrări and Ministerul Afacerilor Interne 
On 5 June 2018, the European Court of Justice ruled that European Union member states must recognise the freedom of movement and residency rights of same-sex spouses, provided one partner is an EU citizen. The Court ruled that EU member states may choose whether or not to allow same-sex marriage, but they cannot obstruct the freedom of residence of an EU citizen and their spouse. Furthermore, the Court ruled that the term "spouse" is gender-neutral, and that it does not necessarily imply a person of the opposite sex.

National level

Subnational level 
For same-sex marriage court cases seeking to recognize individual marriages in the US states see Same-sex marriage in the United States.
For individual amparos and the "México Igualitario" in Mexico see Same-sex marriage in Mexico. For individual injunctions in Brazil see Same-sex marriage in Brazil

See also
 Same-sex union legislation

Notes

References

 
Law-related lists